The first season of Fashion Star, appeared on NBC beginning on March 13, 2012 with 14 designers competing to become a "Fashion Star". The season was presented by Elle Macpherson. Celebrity mentors were Jessica Simpson, Nicole Richie, and John Varvatos. The buyers were Caprice Willard for Macy's, Terron Schaefer for Saks Fifth Avenue, and Nicole M. Christie for H&M.

Designers

Source:

Season progress

 Contestant sold to Macy's for the first time.
 Contestant sold to Saks for the first time.
 Contestant sold to H&M for the first time.
 Contestant has sold to all three buyers.
Results
 Blue background and ADV means that the designer made a sale and advanced to the final.
 Dark blue background and WINNER means that the designer advanced to the final and won the competition.
 Green background and SOLD means that the designer made a sale and was safe for the week.
 Lime green background and RUNNER-UP means that the designer advanced to the final, but did not win the competition.
 Gold background and SAVED means that the designer was one of the bottom three/four designers for the week, but was saved by the mentors.
 Olive background and BTM 4 means that the designer did not make a sale, but still advanced to the final.
 Orange background and BTM 2/3 means that the designer was one of the bottom two/three designers for the week, but was not eliminated.
 Red background and OUT means that the designer did not make a sale and was eliminated from the competition.
 Dark red background and OUT means that the designer made a sale, but was still eliminated from the competition.

Episodes

Episode 1: Pilot
Original Airdate: March 13, 2012

In their first challenge, the designers will be asked to design and create their signature items. After an exhilarating trip down the runway, the retailers will make on-the-spot decisions as they vie for the right to purchase and exclusively carry the work of the up-and-coming designers each week.

 Top sale: $80,000 (Orly for Saks Fifth Avenue & Sarah for H&M)
 Out: Nicholas Bowes

Episode 2: Who's Your Customer
Original Airdate: March 20, 2012

The clothiers hear the demands and needs of their customers. They are given a retail space and then must decide whether to showcase their customers' favorite pieces or go with their own choice of designs.

 Top Sale: $110,000 (Kara for Saks Fifth Avenue)
 Out: Oscar Fierro

Episode 3: Here Comes Summer
Original Airdate: March 27, 2012

The remaining 12 designers look into the future to create a summer trend for their brand. First the designers meet with trend reporters from Macy's, H&M and Saks Fifth Avenue to learn the fashion summer forecast. For the challenge, the designers must create a look that incorporates the summer trends. Some will win big, while others will miss the mark and leave the mentors wondering who they are as a designer. The winning creations will be available online immediately and in stores the following day.

 Top Sale: $120,000 (Orly for Saks Fifth Avenue & Ross for Macy's)
 Out: Lizzie Parker

Episode 4: High-End Appeal/Mass Market Appeal
Original Airdate: April 3, 2012

The designers present two variations on a look: high-end couture and mass market.

 Top Sale: $70,000 (Kara for Saks Fifth Avenue & Nikki for H&M)
 Out: Lisa Vian Hunter

Episode 5: Living Department Store Window
Original Airdate: April 10, 2012

The designers are faced with the challenge of using live models in a blank window space to feature their collections. The window will come to life on the "Fashion Star" stage. The designers who do not get bids from the retailers will find themselves on the brink of elimination.

 Top Sale: $110,000 (Ronnie for Macy's)
 Out: Edmond Newton

Episode 6: Out of the Box
Original Airdate: April 17, 2012

The remaining designers are challenged to expand their brands by creating clothes outside of their comfort zones. A women's designer struggles with how to properly construct a men's garment. Meanwhile, one of the designers adds a sexy edge to his collection. In a twist, the mentors and buyers will not know whose designs they are watching as they bid on their favorite pieces.

 Top Sale: $100,000 (Kara for Saks Fifth Avenue & Luciana for Macy's)
 Out: Barbara Bates

Episode 7: Mentor's Choice
Original Airdate: April 24, 2012

The remaining designers are paired off with celebrity mentors Jessica Simpson, Nicole Richie and John Varvatos. This episode the mentors must decide what each designer will create.

 Top Sale: $100,000 (Kara for Saks Fifth Avenue)
 Out: Sarah Parrott

Episode 8: What's Your Campaign?
Original Airdate: May 1, 2012

The designers are tasked with creating a brand campaign for their collections. Celebrity mentors Jessica Simpson, Nicole Richie and John Varvatos work directly with the designers to provide insight into what makes a successful imaging campaign.

 Top Sale: $100,000 (Nzimiro for Macy's)
 Out: Ross Bennett

Episode 9: Buyer's Choice
Original Airdate: May 8, 2012

In one of the biggest challenges of the competition, the buyer from Macy's, H&M and Saks Fifth Avenue ask the designers to create a piece for their store that they believe is missing from each of the designers' collections. In a twist, it is discovered that receiving a purchase from the retailers does not necessarily ensure the designers' safety from elimination. In the end, three designers who fail to impress the retailers will be sent home.

 Top Sale: $110,000 (Ronnie for H&M)
 Out: Nikki Poulos, Orly Shani, Luciana Scarabello

Episode 10: Finale
Original Airdate: May 15, 2012

The remaining three contestants are tasked with creating separate showcases consisting of three garments for each of the retailers. The designer that can meet the needs of Macy's, H&M and Saks Fifth Avenue will be named America's first "Fashion Star" and receive a capsule collection in each of the stores.

 Winner: Kara Laricks
 Runners-up: Ronnie Escalante & Nzimiro Oputa

Ratings

References

2012 American television seasons